Amanda Louisa Gosein-Cameron (born 10 July 1974), known professionally as Amanda Ghost, is a British music executive, songwriter, singer, and former president of Epic Records (2009–10).

Career
Born in North London to a Gibraltarian mother and an Indo-Trinidadian father, Ghost was encouraged at an early age to play guitar. In 1997, she contributed a version of Gary Numan's "Absolution" to the tribute album Random; unlike the other tracks on the album, it was a song Numan had not released, and came out months before his own version. Her first recording contract was with Warner Bros. Records in Los Angeles, for whom she recorded her first album, Ghost Stories. Ghost's second album was released in autumn 2006 on her own record label, Plan A Records, and was preceded by a limited edition EP, Blood on the Line.

Ghost co-wrote James Blunt's "You're Beautiful", "Beautiful Liar" for Beyoncé and Shakira, and Jordin Sparks' first single "Tattoo". She also co-wrote four songs for Beyoncé's third album, I Am… Sasha Fierce: "Disappear", "Satellites", "Ave Maria" and "Once in a Lifetime". She co-wrote and sang backing vocals on "Colours", which was on the Prodigy's 2009 album, Invaders Must Die. She also collaborated with John Legend on the lyrics for the track "Getting Nowhere" by Magnetic Man.

On 3 February 2009, Ghost was named the new president of Epic Records. She replaced Charlie Walk, who left at the end of 2008 to start his own company.

Ghost co-wrote, with Scott McFarnon and Ian Dench, "Red", a top-5 hit for Daniel Merriweather in the UK in May 2009, and "For the Glory" and "Vanity Kills" by Ian Brown, which she co-wrote with Ian and Dave McCracken. She also co-wrote and produced the Shakira multi-platinum-selling single "Gypsy", from the album She Wolf.

She left her position as president of Epic Records in 2010. and is now the CEO of her own record label, Outsiders, a joint venture with The Universal Music Group. In 2011, she was executive producer for the Scissor Sisters album Magic Hour, and co-wrote the hit single "Only The Horses", co-produced by Calvin Harris. She co-wrote two songs for the Florence and the Machine album Ceremonials, and has more recently collaborated with John Legend, Sub Focus and ASAP Rocky.

Ghost is a three-time Ivor Novello Award winner, a Golden Globe nominee, and has been nominated for three Grammy Awards. One of the latter was as co-producer of two tracks on Beyoncé's album, I Am... Sasha Fierce, which was nominated as Album of the Year, and the other for "Once in a Lifetime", which she co-wrote with Scott McFarnon, Ian Dench, Jody Street, James Dring and Beyoncé. The song was the title track from Beyoncé's film, Cadillac Records and was nominated for the Best Song Written for a Motion Picture Award.

Discography

Singles
"Idol" (2000) - UK number 63
"Glory Girl" (2000)
"Filthy Mind" (2000) - only released in the U.S./Australia
"Break My World" (2004) - UK number 52 †
"Feed" (2004) †
"Girls Like You" - digital only release (2005)
"Monster" - digital only release (2005)
"Blood on the Line" EP (2006)
"Time Machine" (featuring Boy George) (January 2007)

† Credited to Dark Globe featuring Amanda Ghost

Albums
Ghost Stories (2000)
Blood on the Line - The Download Collection (2008)

Songwriting credits

References

External links
Amanda Ghost's MySpace

1974 births
Living people
English dance musicians
English songwriters
English record producers
British music industry executives
Ivor Novello Award winners
Singers from London
English people of Indian descent
English people of Trinidad and Tobago descent
British people of Gibraltarian descent
People from Enfield, London
English women pop singers